Charles Allston Collins (London 25 January 1828 – 9 April 1873) was a British painter, writer, and illustrator associated with the Pre-Raphaelite Brotherhood.

Life and work

Early years
Collins was born in Hampstead, north London, the son of landscape and genre painter William Collins.  His older brother was the novelist Wilkie Collins. He was educated at Stonyhurst College in Lancashire.

Painting career
Collins met John Everett Millais and became influenced by the ideas of the Pre-Raphaelites, completing his painting Berengaria's Alarm in 1850.  This depicted the wife of King Richard the Lionheart noticing her missing husband's girdle offered for sale by a peddlar.  The flattened modelling, emphasis on pattern making, and imagery of embroidery were all characteristic features of Pre-Raphaelitism. Millais proposed that Collins should become a member of the Brotherhood, but Thomas Woolner and William Michael Rossetti objected, so he never became an official member.

Collins fell in love with Maria Francesca Rossetti, but she rejected him. He became increasingly ascetic and introspective.  These attitudes were expressed in Collins's best-known work, Convent Thoughts, which depicted a nun in a convent garden.  Collins went on to exhibit many highly devotional images.

Literary career
In the late 1850s, however, he abandoned art to follow his brother into a writing career.  His most successful literary works were humorous essays collected together under the title The Eye Witness (1860).

Later life
Collins married Charles Dickens's daughter Kate in 1860, and later was engaged to illustrate Dickens's unfinished novel The Mystery of Edwin Drood. He completed the cover but was too ill to do the rest. He died from cancer in 1873 and is buried in Brompton Cemetery, London.

See also
List of Pre-Raphaelite paintings

Further reading

References

External links

C A Collins online (ArtCyclopedia)
C A Collins biography ("Wilkie Collins' Family")

English writers
Pre-Raphaelite painters
1828 births
1873 deaths
Burials at Brompton Cemetery
People educated at Stonyhurst College
19th-century English painters
English male painters
19th-century English male artists
Pre-Raphaelite illustrators
English fantasy writers